Pityophagus is a genus of sap-feeding beetles in the family Nitidulidae. There are about six described species in Pityophagus.

Species
These six species belong to the genus pedro:
 Pityophagus cephalotes LeConte, 1866
 Pityophagus ferrugineus (Linnaeus, 1758)
 Pityophagus laevior Abeille, 1872
 Pityophagus quercus Reitter, 1877
 Pityophagus rufipennis Horn, 1872
 Pityophagus verticalis Horn, 1879

References

Further reading

External links

 

Nitidulidae
Articles created by Qbugbot